Radio UTD is the student-run, internet-only radio station of the University of Texas at Dallas located in Richardson, TX. Radio UTD streams music twenty-four hours a day, seven days a week, with live shows hosted by DJs broadcast Sunday-Friday, 10am-midnight. The station employs seven student managers and is home to roughly 30 student volunteer DJs. Though DJs must be affiliated with UTD as students, staff, or faculty, they can come from any major or department.

Format 

Radio UTD is a freeform station, meaning each DJ is allowed to choose the content of his or her own show regardless of genre, provided the show idea is approved by management. However, some basic criteria apply to all shows. "Music shows" are generally 3-hours-long, while talk, sports, and news shows are generally 1-hour-long. DJs must play nine tracks of 'New Music' each week on their show, they are not allowed to play things you can hear on commercial radio or that have otherwise charted Top 40, and are encouraged to be as diverse and eclectic a set as they want to. Shows consist of music from all different genres including psychedelic rock, indie rock, international music, folk, electronic, drone metal, hip hop, and much more. Radio UTD prides themselves on diversity in music so that everyone can find something to listen to. 'New Music' pertains to albums released within the previous eight weeks and is sent by record labels and local artists.

Each show is three hours long. Demand for slots has risen, forcing more shows to be hosted by two or three DJs instead of one. Everyone is encouraged to apply and there are always spots opening every semester.

History 

Radio UTD was founded in 2003 by students Justin Appleby and Keegan Knittle, and was located inside the Erik Jonsson School of Engineering and Computer Science building. In the Fall of 2005, Radio UTD re-located to the first floor of the Student Union, where they have remained. Expansions, including a new office, took place in Spring 2008, and a new studio was constructed in spring 2012.

College Music Journal has nominated Radio UTD for "Best Student-Run Internet-Only Radio Station" in 2006 and 2007
. These nominations in College Radio Awards caught the attention of some XM Satellite Radio hosts, who invited Radio UTD to have a two-hour show for the XMU radio station in Spring 2008. Later on Radio UTD was featured on their "Student Exchange Program with Billy Zero" in March, May and June 2008 on XMU

.

Radio UTD was nominated for 8 awards for the 2009 College Music Journal Awardsd including: "Station of the Year," "Best Use of Limited Resources," "Biggest Community Resource," "Best Website," and "Best Student-Run Radio Station," among others. Radio UTD was nominated for three College Radio Awards at the 2010 College Music Journal Annual Music Marathon and Festival. The nominations were for the following categories: "Best Use of the Internet," "Best Use of Limited Resources" and "Station of the Year."

In 2011, Radio UTD relocated its station in the Student Union to UT Dallas' new Student Media Suite. The station was again nominated for "Best Use of Limited Resources" and "Best Student-Run, Internet Only Radio Station." 2012 marks Radio UTD's fourth year to be nominated for "Best Use of Limited Resources" and "Best Student-Run, Internet Only Radio Station."

In 2013, Radio UTD won two out of three CMJ College Radio Awards nominations including "Best Student-Run, Internet Only Station" and "Biggest Improvement." The station won "Best Use of Limited Resources" at the CMJ College Radio Awards in 2014.

Radio UTD Blog 
Radio UTD keeps a blog detailing their ticket giveaways, charts, interviews, news and weekly reviews of albums that are adding from RadioUTD to College Music Journal. New sections are being added including a local music blog.

Radio UTD has one Blog Editor who accepts submissions from all DJs. Interviews and ticket giveaways are organized and conducted by the Radio UTD management team unless otherwise specified. Radio UTD has conducted interviews with artists ranging from Man Man, Final Fantasy, Xiu Xiu, Casiotone for the Painfully Alone, Portugal. The Man, Joe Lally, and Girl Talk.

In the Spring of 2018, Blog Editor Roman Soriano won 2nd place in the category of "Electronic Reporting Division 1 - Blog " from the Texas Intercollegiate Press Association.

Radio UTD Events 
In addition to providing online content, Radio UTD also hosts on and off-campus events. The station hosts semesterly events at UT Dallas such as music lectures, dance parties, and Karaoke at the Pub. Radio UTD also curates on-campus concerts (with past artists ranging from national acts such as White Denim, Hundred Waters, Anamanaguchi, and Empress Of to local acts such as -topic and A.Dd+). The station also teams up with local businesses and festivals to host showcases around the DFW-area.

In April 2018, all of UTD Student Media hosted a "Sweet Fifteen Fest," which celebrated Radio UTD's 15-year anniversary of providing college radio to the University of Texas at Dallas. At the event, there were ticket giveaways, exclusive Radio UTD merchandise, mixtapes curated by current DJs, and live music from Luna Luna, OG Garden, and Pearl Earl.

References

External links 
radioutd.com
RadioUTD Programming
Apply to RadioUTD

Internet radio stations in the United States
University of Texas at Dallas